Sightings of the American singer Elvis Presley have been reported following his death in 1977. The conspiracy theory that Elvis did not die and instead went into hiding was popularized by Gail Brewer-Giorgio and other authors.

Notable sighting claims 

The earliest known alleged sighting of Elvis was at the Memphis International Airport where a man resembling Elvis gave the name "Jon Burrows", which was the same name Elvis used when booking hotels. A series of alleged sightings took place in Kalamazoo, Michigan, in the late 1980s. Such reports encountered public ridicule and became fodder for humorous publications like the Weekly World News. In California, many people believed they had seen Elvis at California's Legoland amusement park shortly after opening in 1999. It was later revealed that Elvis impersonators were hired as an attraction to commemorate Presley.

In late 1988, record label LS Records released the song "Spelling on the Stone", sung by an unknown vocalist purporting to be Presley. The song's narrative suggested that Presley had not actually died. Airplay received by the song on country music formats caused a number of listeners to call in to radio stations and report sightings of the singer after hearing the song, while program directors of said stations debated whether or not the song's vocal track was actually Presley.

Elvis was rumored to have appeared in the background of an airport scene in the 1990 film Home Alone. It was alleged that the bearded man wearing a turtleneck and a sports jacket who could be seen over the left shoulder of Catherine O'Hara's character while she is arguing with an airline employee was Elvis. Paranormal researcher Ben Radford responded to Elvis sighting believers with, "Why fake your death and then turn up as an extra in a popular movie? How could the cast and crew have failed to notice the presence of one of the most famous figures in the world? Even if he looked very different, could he have disguised his voice and mannerisms?"  Radford was challenged to find the actor who played that part to prove it was not Elvis. He explained that the burden of proof was on the person making the claim. In an interview with USA Today, director Chris Columbus responded "If Elvis was on the set, I would have known".

After being challenged by Radford to locate the true identity of this extra, Kenny Biddle investigated and found the man to be Gary Richard Grott, who died of a heart attack in February 2016. Biddle located Grott's son, Roman, who explained that his father was indeed the extra in the airport scene of Home Alone, and that he had known director Chris Columbus personally. Because of this he appeared in a number of his movies as an extra, including Home Alone.

Bill Bixby, who co-starred with Elvis in Clambake and Speedway, hosted two television specials investigating the conspiracy: The Elvis Files (1991) and The Elvis Conspiracy (1992). The conspiracy was also featured in the 1990 video game, Les Manley in: Search for the King, where the titular hero attempts to find Elvis (known in the game as "the King") to win a million-dollar contest.

Some believe that Elvis attended his own 82nd birthday. An old man by the name of Bob Joyce with security guards around him, all grey hair, grey beard, sunglasses and a ball cap on, was believed by conspiracy theorists to be Elvis.

A similar looking man was seen working as a groundskeeper for Graceland, and was also believed to be Elvis.

A group of people believe that Elvis was somehow involved with the Mafia during his time as a rock star, served as an undercover agent and was found out. Thus, they believe he faked his own death to try to fool the mafia.

References

Urban legends
Elvis Presley
Presley, Elvis